Bridelia micrantha, the mitzeeri or the coastal golden-leaf, is a tree in the family Phyllanthaceae and is native to tropical and southern Africa as well as to the island of Réunion in the Indian Ocean.

Description
A medium to tall tree (up to 20 m), with a dense widely spreading crown. The leaves are large, alternate and simple. The tree may be deciduous or evergreen.

Habitat
They are found growing in coastal forests (such as KwaZulu-Natal Coastal Lowland Forest), riverine forest, swamp forest, woodland and along forest margins.

Native distribution
Bridelia micrantha is native to primarily tropical, northeast, western, west-central, and southern Africa (in Angola; Benin; Burkina Faso; Cameroon; Central African Republic; Côte d'Ivoire; Equatorial Guinea; the Democratic Republic of the Congo; Ethiopia; Gabon; Gambia; Ghana; Guinea; Kenya; Liberia; Malawi; Mali; Mozambique; Nigeria; Rwanda; São Tomé and Príncipe; Senegal; Sierra Leone; South Africa (in Eastern Cape, KwaZulu-Natal, Limpopo, Mpumalanga; and Eswatini); Sudan; Tanzania (inclusive of the Zanzibar Archipelago); Togo; Uganda; Zambia; and Zimbabwe); and the western Indian Ocean island of Réunion.

Ecological significance
Bridelia micrantha is a larval food plant for butterflies such as: Abantis paradisea, Charaxes castor flavifasciatus and Parosmodes morantii morantii, and also the silkmoth Anaphe panda.

Ethnobotanical medicinal use
Bridelia micrantha has been used locally in folk medicine, variously as an anti-abortifacient, an antidote, a laxative or purgative; and to treat diverse conditions of the central nervous system (headache), eye (infections, conjunctivitis), the gastrointestinal system (abdominal pain, constipation, gastritis), respiratory system (common cold), and the skin (scabies); and used hygienically as a mouthwash.

References

External links

micrantha
Plants described in 1843
Trees of Africa
Flora of Réunion
Butterfly food plants
Plants used in traditional African medicine
Taxa named by Henri Ernest Baillon
Taxa named by Christian Ferdinand Friedrich Hochstetter